Other Women may refer to:

 "Other Women" (Charmed 2018 TV series), a television episode
 "Other Women" (The Handmaid's Tale), a television episode
 The Other Women, a 2000 album by the Corn Sisters

See also
 The Other Woman (disambiguation)